Lobelia cardinalis, the cardinal flower (syn. L. fulgens), is a species of flowering plant in the bellflower family   Campanulaceae native to the Americas, from southeastern Canada south through the eastern and southwestern United States, Mexico and Central America to northern Colombia.

Description

Forms with white (f. alba) and pink (f. rosea) flowers are also known. It grows along streams, springs, swamps, and in low wooded areas.

Lobelia cardinalis is related to two other Lobelia species in to the Eastern United States, Lobelia inflata (Indian tobacco) and Lobelia siphilitica (great lobelia); all display the characteristic "lip" petal near the opening of the flower and the "milky" liquid the plant excretes. L. siphilitica has blue flowers and is primarily pollinated by bees, whereas L. cardinalis is red and is primarily pollinated by the ruby-throated hummingbird (Archilochus colubris).

Etymology
It was introduced to Europe in the mid-1620s, where the name cardinal flower was in use by 1629, likely due to the similarity of the flower's color to the vesture of Roman Catholic Cardinals.

Cultivation
In cultivation L. cardinalis requires rich, deep soil which remains reliably moist year-round. The cultivar 'Queen Victoria' has gained the Royal Horticultural Society's Award of Garden Merit. 

This plant is easily propagated by seed and dividing out the young plants which form around the older mature plants each year.  Although the plant is generally considered a perennial, they may be short lived. They prefer moist soils in part shade.

Medicinal and other uses
The Zuni people use this plant as an ingredient of "schumaakwe cakes" and used it externally for rheumatism and swelling.  The Penobscot people smoked the dried leaves as a substitute for tobacco. It may also have been chewed.

Toxicity
As a member of the genus Lobelia, it is considered to be potentially toxic.  Symptoms of ingestion of large quantities include nausea, vomiting, diarrhea, salivation, exhaustion and weakness, dilation of pupils, convulsions, and coma. The plant contains a number of toxic alkaloids including lobelamine and lobeline.

References

cardinalis
Flora of North America
Plants used in traditional Native American medicine
Flora of Colombia
Plants described in 1753
Taxa named by Carl Linnaeus